This is a list of places named for James K. Polk, the 11th president of the United States from 1845 to 1849.

Buildings
 President James K. Polk Home & Museum, Polk's young adult home in Columbia, Tennessee
 Polk Place, Polk's now-demolished home in Nashville, Tennessee
 President James K. Polk Historic Site, historic reconstruction of the cabin Polk was born in.

Ships
 USS James K. Polk (SSBN-645)
 USS President Polk (AP-103)

Counties
 Polk County, Arkansas
 Polk County, Florida
 Polk County, Georgia
 Polk County, Iowa
 Polk County, Minnesota
 Polk County, Nebraska
 Polk County, Oregon
 Polk County, Tennessee
 Polk County, Texas
 Polk County, Wisconsin

Note
Polk County, Missouri, was named after Ezekiel Polk, President Polk's grandfather. Polk County, North Carolina, was named after Col. William Polk, President Polk's first cousin, once removed, who fought in the American Revolutionary War.

Cities
 Polk City, Florida
 Polk City, Iowa

Boroughs
 Polk Borough, Venango County, Pennsylvania

Townships
Polk Township, Crawford County, Ohio
Polkton Township, Michigan

University locations
Polk Place at the University of North Carolina at Chapel Hill

See also
Presidential memorials in the United States
List of places named for George Washington
List of places named for Thomas Jefferson
List of places named for James Monroe
List of places named for Andrew Jackson
List of things named after Ronald Reagan
List of things named after George Bush
List of things named after Bill Clinton
List of things named after Barack Obama
List of things named after Donald Trump

Other
Polk Street, Chicago
Polk Street, San Francisco
James K. Polk Elementary School, a public elementary school for grades K-5 in Alexandria, Virginia 
James K. Polk Elementary School, a public elementary school for grades K-6 in Fresno, California 
"James K. Polk" is the title of a song by They Might Be Giants, on their album Factory Showroom.

James K. Polk
Polk
Polk, James